SS Howell E. Jackson was a Liberty ship built in the United States during World War II. She was named after Howell E. Jackson, an Associate Justice of the Supreme Court of the United States and a United States senator from Tennessee.

Construction
Howell E. Jackson was laid down on 22 May 1943, under a Maritime Commission (MARCOM) contract, MC hull 1498, by J.A. Jones Construction, Brunswick, Georgia; sponsored by Nobie Ramspeck, wife of House Majority Whip Robert Ramspeck, and launched on 6 September 1943.

History
She was allocated to Marine Transport Line, on 25 September 1943. On 7 June 1948, she was laid up in the National Defense Reserve Fleet in Wilmington, North Carolina. On 9 August 1962, she was sold to North American Smelting Company, for $45,025, for scrapping, she was delivered on 29 August 1962.

References

Bibliography

 
 
 
 
 
 

 

Liberty ships
Ships built in Brunswick, Georgia
1943 ships
Wilmington Reserve Fleet